Bahçevan  (tr),Kara Sandık Açamadım, Lo Lo  , (Armenian: Dari Lolo), (Hebrew:Debka Daluna) is an anonymous Turkish, Armenian, Jewish and Arabic dabke. Hebrew lyrics written by Emanuel Zamir. The first known Armenian recording was made by Armenian genocide survivor Megerdich Douzjian (b. 1896 Diyarbakir – d. 1958 New Jersey) in 1928 in New Jersey, titled "Shad Anoush". The author of the Armenian lyrics is unknown, though it may have been Douzjian himself.

Original form 
The original form of the dabke was popular folk dance in Levant.

See also
Dabke

References

External links

Jewish songs
Arabic music
Turkish songs
Turkish dances
Year of song unknown
Songwriter unknown